Landtag elections in the Free State of Thuringia (Freistaat Thüringen) during the Weimar Republic were held at irregular intervals between 1920 and 1932. Results with regard to the total vote, the percentage of the vote won and the number of seats allocated to each party are presented in the tables below. On 31 March 1933, the sitting Landtag was dissolved by the Nazi-controlled central government and reconstituted to reflect the distribution of seats in the national Reichstag. The Landtag subsequently was formally abolished as a result of the "Law on the Reconstruction of the Reich" of 30 January 1934 which replaced the German federal system with a unitary state.

1920
The 1920 Thuringian state election was held on 20 June 1920 to elect 53 members of the Landtag of Thuringia.

1921
The 1921 Thuringian state election was held on 11 September 1921 to elect 54 members of the Landtag.

1924
The 1924 Thuringian state election was held on 10 February 1924 to elect 72 members of the Landtag.

1927
The 1927 Thuringian state election was held on 30 January 1927 to elect 56 members of the Landtag.

1929
The 1929 Thuringian state election was held on 8 December 1929 to elect 53 members of the Landtag.

1932
The 1932 Thuringian state election was held on 31 July 1932 to elect 61 members of the Landtag.

References

Elections in the Weimar Republic
Elections in Thuringia
Thuringia
Thuringia
Thuringia
Thuringia
Thuringia
Thuringia